Larkin Township may refer to the following places in the United States:

 Larkin Charter Township, Michigan
 Larkin Township, Nobles County, Minnesota

Township name disambiguation pages